is a professional Japanese baseball player. He plays pitcher for the Orix Buffaloes.

References 

1992 births
Living people
Baseball people from Saitama Prefecture
Meiji University alumni
Nippon Professional Baseball pitchers
Orix Buffaloes players
People from Tokorozawa, Saitama
Indios de Mayagüez players
Japanese expatriate baseball players in Puerto Rico